Montreal Hornets was a Canadian football team in Interprovincial Rugby Football Union. The team played in the 1945 season.

IRFU season-by-season

References
CFLdb - Montreal Hornets

Interprovincial Rugby Football Union teams
Defunct Canadian football teams
Ind